"Final Exit" is a Fear Factory single released in 2010. Hence its title, it is the final track on Fear Factory's seventh studio album Mechanize. It is the album's tenth song and third single. According to critics, "Final Exit" is the best closing song of Fear Factory, due to the way samples play underneath metal riffs and noisy rhythms.

With the song length of 8 minutes 17 seconds for the album version, it is the fourth longest Fear Factory song to date. The music video for this song has never been released.

Lyrics
"Final Exit" is about being dead rather than living a life full of pain. The lyrics were written by Fear Factory; the voice heard at the beginning of the song is that of Derek Humphry, who started the Death with Dignity movement and is the author of the best selling book Final Exit: the Practicalities of Self Deliverance and Assisted Suicide for the Dying.

Tribute and quote
This song pays tribute to Final Exit Network, a nonprofit group that supports self-determination and the right to death with dignity for competent adults living with debilitating medical conditions.  The song helped more people become aware of the information and compassionate presence provided by the Final Exit Network.

Fear Factory frontman Burton C. Bell explained:

References

Fear Factory songs
2010 singles
Songs written by Burton C. Bell
2010 songs
Songs written by Dino Cazares